Abdi Nazemian is an Iranian-American author, screenwriter, and producer whose debut novel The Walk-In Closet won the Lambda Literary Award for Debut Fiction at the 27th Lambda Literary Awards in 2015.

Career 
Nazemian is a Choate Rosemary Hall alumni. It was at Choate that he first wanted to become a writer. Nazemian continued his education at Columbia University and then at the University of California, Los Angeles, where he received an MBA.

Since, Nazemian has also worked as a screenwriter, including the television shows Ordinary Joe, Almost Family and The Village, and the films The Artist's Wife, Menendez: Blood Brothers, Beautiful Girl, Celeste in the City and The Quiet. As head of development for Water's End Productions, Nazemian has served as an executive producer or associate producer on numerous films, including Call Me By Your Name, Little Woods, Scotty and the Secret History of Hollywood, It Happened in L.A., The Price, and The House of Tomorrow.

Literary work 
His debut young adult novel, The Authentics, was released in 2017 by Balzer + Bray / HarperCollins. His third novel, Like A Love Story, a love letter to queer history, ACT UP and Madonna, was released in 2019 by Balzer + Bray / HarperCollins. It was chosen by Time magazine as one of the hundred best young adult novels of all time, received a Stonewall Honor and a nomination for the Audie Awards. His fourth novel, The Chandler Legacies, which is inspired by his time at boarding school, was published by Balzer + Bray / HarperCollins in 2022.

References

External links

1976 births
21st-century American novelists
American male novelists
Lambda Literary Award for Debut Fiction winners
American LGBT novelists
American LGBT screenwriters
Iranian emigrants to the United States
American gay writers
Living people
21st-century American male writers
21st-century American screenwriters
Columbia College (New York) alumni
UCLA Anderson School of Management alumni
21st-century LGBT people